WFQX may refer to:

 WFQX-TV, a television station (channel 32 digital) licensed to Cadillac, Michigan, United States
 WFQX (FM), a radio station (99.3 FM) licensed to Front Royal, Virginia, United States